"Viking Death March" is the first single by Billy Talent from their fourth studio album, Dead Silence. It was released on May 25, 2012.

Song Information
On May 14, 2012, the band announced in a video announcement on their YouTube channel that their new album would be delayed until the fall, instead of the previous tentative release date of July 2012, though a new song would be released until the end of the month. On May 18, 2012, the band released a teaser of the single and announced that the full song would be released on SoundCloud May 25, 2012.

Gregory Adams of Exclaim! describes the song as fused the band's typical "post-hardcore licks" with elements of new wave of British heavy metal and a time signature of 6/8.

Music video
The music video was released on the band's official website and on the band's YouTube channel on July 16, 2012. It is a live music video compiled from live footage that was shot during the band's performances at the Rock am Ring festival in Nürburg, Germany on June 2, and at the Melkweg in Amsterdam, Netherlands on June 6. The music video was directed by Michael Maxxis and David Hogan.

Charts

References

2012 singles
Protest songs
Billy Talent songs
Songs written by Ian D'Sa
Songs written by Benjamin Kowalewicz
Songs written by Jonathan Gallant
Songs written by Aaron Solowoniuk
2012 songs
Warner Music Group singles